U.S. Route 441 (US 441) is a north–south United States Highway that runs from Miami, Florida to Rocky Top, Tennessee. US 441 is a primary route connecting the cities of Franklin, Sylva, and Cherokee in western North Carolina. The highway runs concurrently with other U.S. highways for much of its routing in North Carolina including US 23 from the Georgia state line to Dillsboro, US 64 in Franklin, US 74 from Dillsboro to near Qualla, and US 19 in Cherokee. US 441 has two business routes in North Carolina, in Franklin and Cherokee. 

Established in 1926 between Orlando and Ocala, Florida. By 1951, US 441 had be extended north from Ocala, Florida to Baldwin, Georgia. Transportation officials in North Carolina, Tennessee, and Georgia applied to extend US 441 from Baldwin, Georgia to US 129 in [[, US 441 was extended through North Carolina in 1951 running along a relatively similar routing as today. Its extension overlaid existing highways, US 23 from Georgia to Franklin and North Carolina Highway 107 (NC 107) from Franklin to the Tennessee state line. NC 107 was truncated to Sylva in 1956, removing the concurrency. US 441 was placed on a bypass east of Franklin in 1974, with the highway's former alignment becoming US 441 Business. Later that year, the highway was placed onto a new alignment in Dillsboro, continuing to an interchange with US 19A and US 23. The routing of US 441 has remained consistent since 1975. No US 441 signage is present within the Great Smoky Mountains National Park, which was requested by the National Park Service in 1970.

Route description
Upon crossing the state line from Georgia, US 23/US 441 enter the Nantahala National Forest. The concurrent routes head north through a pair of small communities before intersecting US 64 in Franklin. US 23/US 441 turn east, briefly overlapping US 64 southeast of Franklin before separating from the route and continuing to the northeast through the Cowee Mountains. After passing Dillsboro, US 23/US 441 intersect US 74 (Great Smoky Mountains Expressway); US 23 splits east towards Waynesville, while US 441 joins US 74 westbound towards Bryson City.  After traversing  along the northern banks of the Tuckasegee River, US 441 splits from US 74 and continues north into the Qualla Boundary, along Beloved Man Dr Jerry Wolfe Highway. In Cherokee, US 441 shares a short  concurrency with US 19, then continues north along the west bank of the Oconaluftee River.  After entering the Great Smoky Mountains National Park, US 441 connects to the southern terminus of the Blue Ridge Parkway. Known officially in the park as Newfound Gap Road, US 441 traverses northwesterly through park until it reaches Newfound Gap at the Tennessee state line.

US 441 within the Great Smoky Mountains National Park is maintained by the National Park Service and no commercial traffic is allowed.  During the winter season, the road in the high elevation may be temporary closed due to inclement weather; signs after the park entrance and/or at the Oconaluftee Visitor Center will notify travelers/visitors on any closings or condition changes.

US 441 also makes up part of Corridor A and Corridor K in the Appalachian Development Highway System (ADHS).  Corridor A connects Interstate 285 (I-285) in Sandy Springs, Georgia to I-40 near Clyde, North Carolina; it overlaps  of US 441.  Corridor K connects I-75 in Cleveland, Tennessee with US 23 in Dillsboro; it overlaps  of US 441.  ADHS provides additional funds, as authorized by the United States Congress, which have enabled US 441 to benefit from the successive improvements along its routing in both corridors.  The white-on-blue banner "Appalachian Highway" is used to mark the ADHS corridor.

History
US 441 was originally established as an original United States Numbered Highway travelling completely within the state of Florida between Orlando and Ocala. By 1951, US 441 had be extended north from Ocala, Florida to Baldwin, Georgia. Transportation officials in North Carolina, Tennessee, and Georgia applied to extend US 441 from Baldwin, Georgia to US 129 in Lake City, Tennessee. In 1951, the request was approved by the American Association of State Highway Officials (AASHO) in 1951, officially extending the highway into North Carolina. The new routing of US 441 ran concurrently with US 23 from Baldwin through Georgia and into North Carolina. In North Carolina, the new routing of US 441 was placed in concurrency with US 23 between the Georgia state line and Dillsboro. US 441 also followed along a  concurrency with US 64 east of Franklin. Northwest of Dillsboro, US 441 was placed concurrently with US 19A for  parallel to the Tuckasegee River. US 441 then replaced NC 107 from US 19A through Cherokee and the Great Smoky Mountains National Park to the Tennessee state line where it continued towards Gatlinburg. 

In 1970, the National Park Service requested, and subsequently approved, that US 441 shields be discontinued through the Great Smoky Mountains National Park. In 1974, US 23/US 441 was placed on new bypass east of Franklin; its old alignment through Franklin became US 441 Business  (US 441 Bus.). In Dillsboro, US 441 was placed on new alignment continuing north from Haywood Road onto new interchange with US 19A/US 23; its old alignment along Haywood Road was downgraded to secondary road.

No major changes have been made since the mid-1970s, however modernizing improvements have been made including the construction of additional lanes and full interchanges at major intersections along its route.

Junction list

Special routes

Franklin business loop

U.S. Route 441 Business (US 441 Bus), established in 1974, is a  business route that traverses through downtown Franklin via Porter Street, Palmer Street, and Main Street.  A couple of months after its initial establishment, it was adjusted in the downtown area along the one-way streets.

Cherokee business loop

U.S. Route 441 Business (US 441 Bus), established in 1988, is a  business route that traverses through downtown Cherokee via Casino Trail, Paint Town Road, and Tsalagi Road.  The business route was established as a new routing through the downtown area; today it provides a direct route to Harrah's Cherokee.

See also

References

External links

 
 NCRoads.com: US 441
 NCRoads.com: US 441 Business

41-4
 North Carolina
Transportation in Macon County, North Carolina
Transportation in Jackson County, North Carolina
Transportation in Swain County, North Carolina